Park Tae-Hong (born March 25, 1991) is a South Korean football player who currently plays for K3 League side Busan Transportation Corporation FC.

Club statistics

References

External links

1991 births
Living people
Association football defenders
South Korean footballers
South Korean expatriate footballers
J2 League players
K League 2 players
Yokohama FC players
Kataller Toyama players
Daegu FC players
Busan IPark players
Gyeongnam FC players
Expatriate footballers in Japan
South Korean expatriate sportspeople in Japan
Hong Kong First Division League players
Expatriate footballers in Hong Kong
South Korean expatriate sportspeople in Hong Kong
Yokohama FC Hong Kong players